is a Japanese television drama series that aired on Fuji TV in 2006. Yūki Amami, who is known for The Queen's Classroom played the lead role for the first time in getsuku drama. The first episode received a viewership rating of 23.1%.

Cast
 Yūki Amami as Haruka Tsubaki
 Akiko Yada as Nozomi Asuka
 Hiroshi Tamaki as Kensuke Kanihara
 Nao Matsushita as Mei Nohara
 Shota Matsuda as Shunpei Iga
 Shōsuke Tanihara as Masato Yūki

References

External links
 Official site 

2006 Japanese television series debuts
2006 Japanese television series endings
Fuji TV dramas
Japanese drama television series
Television shows written by Yûji Sakamoto